The Modern Slavery Act 2015 is an Act of the Parliament of the United Kingdom. It is designed to combat modern slavery in the UK and consolidates previous offences relating to trafficking and slavery. The act extends essentially to England and Wales, but some provisions (for example, relating to modern slavery statements and cross-border pursuit) apply in Scotland and Northern Ireland.

The bill was introduced to the House of Commons in draft form in October 2013 by James Brokenshire, Parliamentary Under Secretary for Crime and Security. The bill's sponsors in the Home Office were Theresa May and Lord Bates. It received Royal Assent and became law on 26 March 2015.

James Brokenshire was quoted as saying that the act would "send the strongest possible message to criminals that if you are involved in this disgusting trade in human beings, you will be arrested, you will be prosecuted and you will be locked up".

Provisions 
The act contains a number of provisions:

 The consolidation of the existing slavery and trafficking offences
 The introduction of two new civil orders to enable the courts to place restrictions on those convicted of modern slavery offences, or those involved in such offences but not yet convicted
 The establishment of an independent Anti-Slavery Commissioner to encourage good practice on the prevention of modern slavery offences and the identification of victims. The first commissioner was Kevin Hyland
 The provision of mechanisms for seizing traffickers’ assets and channelling some of that money towards victims for compensation payments
 The creation of a new statutory defence for slavery or trafficking victims compelled to commit criminal offences
 The provision of child trafficking advocates

Amendments to the bill

Supply chain 
The draft bill included no measures to counter the use of slave labour abroad as the Home Office believed that asking businesses to audit and report on modern slavery in their supply chains would be an "additional burden". However, campaigning resulted in a supply chain clause being added to the bills so that "big business will be forced to make public its efforts to stop the use of slave labour by its suppliers". Consultation regarding the reporting requirements of the supply chain clause took place in February and March 2015.

From 29 October 2015 the Transparency in Supply Chain Provisions require businesses to publish an annual statement if they have an annual turnover above a threshold (£36 million). The statement must confirm the steps taken to ensure that slavery and human trafficking are not taking place in the business (or in any supply chain) or declare that no steps to confirm the existence of slavery or trafficking have been taken. It is expected that few businesses would take the latter option as it may place their ethical position into question and affect their reputation. There are, however, no legally binding requirements to conduct due diligence on supply chains and there are no criminal or financial penalties for non-compliance.

On 21 March 2016 the Home Office held a Transparency in Supply Chains (TISC) event where an independent civil society modern slavery register, the TISC Report, was announced in order to provide a publicly searchable, accessible registry for companies to share their statements. At the point of launch, on 1 April 2016, it was partnered with, amongst others, the Welsh Government, the Chartered Institute of Procurement & Supply, the International Chamber of Commerce (ICC), and Business West. On 31 January 2017 it had 10,153 companies with statements held within its open data register, making it the largest modern slavery statement register globally.

In 2019 the UK Government committed to publishing a Modern Slavery Statement of its own, reflecting the requirements imposed on larger businesses under section 54 of the 2015 Act. The statement was published on 26 March 2020.

Prostitution 
In November 2014 Fiona Mactaggart MP added an amendment to the bill concerning prostitution, aimed at criminalising the purchase of sex. In the bill's debate in the House of Commons, John McDonnell MP argued against the amendment. He highlighted the lack of evidence for any correlation between the Swedish sex purchase ban and a reduction in numbers of sex workers or their clients, and cited findings "that not only do such measures not work, they actually cause harm". McDonnell quoted Reverend Andrew Dotchin, a founding member of the Safety First Coalition: "I strongly oppose clauses on prostitution in the Modern Slavery Bill, which would make the purchase of sex illegal. Criminalising clients does not stop prostitution, nor does it stop the criminalisation of women. It drives prostitution further underground, making it more dangerous and stigmatising for women." The amendment was subsequently dropped.

Tied visas 
In March 2015 an amendment was brought forward in the House of Lords concerning migrant workers who are brought to the UK by their employer using "tied visas". These workers are typically foreign domestic workers and they are not allowed to legally leave their job and find employment elsewhere. The system of tied visas, introduced in 2012, has been compared to the kafala system of employer-sponsored workers used in some Middle East countries. The amendment would have given workers in the UK using tied visas the right to change employer, but it was rejected by the House of Commons.

Criticism of the bill 
Experts in the issue were sceptical of the bill, believing that it had many shortcomings. Parosha Chandran, a human rights barrister and United Nations expert on trafficking, claimed that "the bill is very poor on victim protection". Anthony Steen, who advised on the legislation and chairs the Human Trafficking Foundation, claimed that the bill failed to focus on the needs of victims of trafficking in the UK. "The bill is wholly and exclusively about law enforcement – but it shouldn’t be enforcement-based, it should be victim-based", he said.

Human rights group Liberty argued that the bill should have: 
 Addressed abuses associated with the Domestic Overseas Worker Visa which prohibits individuals from changing their employer
 Addressed the conflict of interest arising from UK Visas and Immigration being involved with the National Referral Mechanism which is used to identify trafficking victims and which acts as a gateway to support
 Extended legal aid to slavery victims in civil matters

Implementation of the act 
One of the aims of the Home Affairs Select Committee's inquiry into prostitution legislation, which began in January 2016, was to examine the impact that the act had had on trafficking for the purposes of prostitution and whether further measures were needed to help those involved in prostitution to leave it. Submissions to the inquiry published in June 2016 said that there had been 1,139 victims of trafficking for sexual exploitation in 2014.

A review of the act in 2016 found that 289 offences were prosecuted under the act in 2015, and that there had been a 40% rise in the number of victims referred for support. In July 2016 the Anti-Slavery Commissioner suggested that the number of crimes being reported and investigated under the act was falling short of the real number of cases of human trafficking and modern slavery. In the same month prime minister Theresa May announced additional measures to assist the implementation of the act:
 The creation of a task force to coordinate government action
 A budget allocation of £33.5 million
 An assessment of consistency in police approach by Her Majesty's Inspectorate of Constabulary

In 2017, figures published by the National Crime Agency indicated that there were over 300 current police operations investigating possible violations of the act, and that a total of 3,805 people had been reported as potential victims in 2016. In September 2017 alone, nine people were jailed for offences under the act.

In other countries
By 2018 legislation intended to reduce the impact of modern slavery on supply chains had been passed by seven of the G20 countries (including the UK). In 2018 the Government of Australia introduced a Modern Slavery Bill to the Parliament of Australia, using the United Kingdom’s Modern Slavery Act 2015 as a model. The bill was introduced following an Inquiry instigated, led and undertaken by the Foreign Affairs & Aid Sub-Committee of the Joint Standing Committee on Foreign Affairs, Defence and Trade, chaired by then Australian MP Chris Crewther. The Sub-Committee through its Inquiry looked into whether Australia should adopt a comparable Modern Slavery Act, gave in-principle support for the proposal in its August 2017 Interim Report, and gave full support through the recommendations of its final report, "Hidden in Plain Sight", in December 2017.

It was passed into law as the Modern Slavery Act 2018 in November 2018, with effect from 1 January 2019. The reporting threshold is annual revenue above A$100 million, with strengths beyond the original UK Act including a legislated government-run central repository of statements, mandatory prescribed criteria for statements, government being required to report, a legislated three year review, and some compliance measures enabling the listing of entities who do not report, or do not report properly, by the Minister.

See also
 Human trafficking in the United Kingdom
 Migrant domestic workers
 Ethical trade

References

External links
 The Modern Slavery Act (2015) – UK government website

Criminal law of the United Kingdom
2015 in British law
Slavery legislation
United Kingdom Acts of Parliament 2015
Modern slavery in the United Kingdom
March 2015 events in the United Kingdom